The 1958–59 season was the 57th in the history of the Western Football League.

The champions for the first time in their history were Yeovil Town Reserves, and the winners of Division Two were Bath City Reserves.

Division One
Division One remained at nineteen clubs after Chippenham United were relegated the previous season, Trowbridge Town joined the Southern League, and two clubs joined:

Gloucester City Reserves, runners-up in Division Two
Poole Town Reserves, champions of Division Two

Division Two
Division Two was reduced from eighteen clubs to seventeen after Gloucester City Reserves and Poole Town Reserves were promoted to Division One, Clevedon left, and two new clubs joined:

Bridgwater Town Reserves
Chippenham United, relegated from Division One.

References

1958-59
5